The 1949 Roussillon Grand Prix (formally the IV Grand Prix du Roussillon) was a Grand Prix motor race held at Circuit des Platanes de Perpignan on 8 May 1949. The Grand Prix was raced in two 50 laps sessions, with the final standing given by the addition of the two results.

Entry list
Juan Manuel Fangio is on a two victory in a row (San Remo and Pau) for his first racing season in Europe.
Henri Louveau share during the races his Delage 3000 n°22 with Francisco Godia Sales. Eugène Martin wasn't present despite his commitment.

Qualifying

Classification
The heat 1 saw Juan Manuel Fangio and Luigi Villoresi fight for the first position but the Italian driver entered the pits to repair an oil pump problem. Luigi Villoresi lost 5 laps and Juan Manual Fangio finished the 50 laps first with 25 seconds ahead of Prince Bira.

In the second heat, Prince Bira took the lead immediately over Juan Manuel Fangio who kept a close gap with the Siam driver. Prince Bira who needed to distance the Argentine attack and realized the fastest lap was 1:27.3 and won Heat 2 with less than a second ahead of Juan Manuel Fangio, Luigi Villoresi finished third.

Juan Manuel Fangio won the Grand Prix. It was his third of four consecutive wins in France. Prince Bira finished second and Argentine Benedicto Campos third. Fangio won his third victory in a row in Grand Prix motor racing.

Heat 1

Pole position: Prince Bira in 1.27.9
Fastest lap: Juan Manuel Fangio in 1:29.2 (102.37 km/h).

Heat 2

Pole position: Juan Manuel Fangio (The starting grid of the heat 2 is the order of the standing from the heat 1).
Fastest lap: Prince Bira in 1:27.3

Aggregate final standing

References

Roussillon Grand Prix
Roussillon Grand Prix
Roussillon Grand Prix
Roussillon Grand Prix